The feudal barony of Kirkintilloch was a feudal barony with its caput baronium originally at Kirkintilloch Castle in East Dunbartonshire, Scotland. The barony was granted to William Comyn, Baron Lenzie in 1184. After the Comyns were disinherited by King Robert the Bruce, the barony was given to the Fleming family after 1306.

Citations

References
Irving, Joseph. The History of Dumbartonshire, Civil, Ecclesiastical, and Territorial: With Genealogical Notices of the Principal Families in the County: the Whole Based on Authentic Records, Public and Private. (1860).

Feudalism in Scotland
Scottish society
East Dunbartonshire
Kirkintilloch
Kirkintilloch
Titles in Scotland
Lists of nobility
Scots law
Scotland